Alef Mangueira Severino Pereira (born 29 November 1994), known as Alef Manga, is a Brazilian footballer who plays as a forward for Coritiba.

Club career
Born in Santos, São Paulo, Alef Manga began his career at a futsal club in his hometown called Saldanha da Gama, at the age of five. In 2007, aged 12, he was invited to play for the futsal team of Santos, and later moved to football. However, he was released in 2011 and subsequently represented Jabaquara and São Vicente.

After finishing his formation, Alef Manga made his senior debut with Campeonato Paulista Segunda Divisão side Bandeirante; at that time, he was known as Dodô. He returned to Jabaquara for the 2016 season, and moved to the Paraná state in 2017 to join Cascavel CR.

Alef Manga was the top scorer of the second division of the Campeonato Paranaense for Cascavel, and was also the top scorer of the year's Taça FPF, while playing for Maringá. He moved to FC Cascavel for the 2018 Paranaense, but was loaned back to Maringá on 28 March of that year.

Alef Manga was released by Maringá in May 2018, after only two matches, and agreed to a move abroad in August, joining Oliveirense of the Portuguese LigaPro. After struggling with injuries, he returned to Brazil in 2019, and subsequently joined Coruripe.

Alef Manga moved to ASA in April 2019, but left the club in June after their elimination from the 2020 Série D. In July, he agreed to a deal with Portuguesa for the year's Copa Paulista, but left on 2 August without making a single appearance;

On 9 December 2019, Alef Manga agreed to join Resende for the 2020 Campeonato Carioca. He then returned to Coruripe the following July, but moved to Volta Redonda on 24 September 2020, as a replacement to Saulo Mineiro.

After impressing with Voltaço in the 2020 Série C, Alef Manga signed a permanent two-year deal with the club on 7 January 2021. He went on to score nine goals in the 2021 Carioca, and moved to Série B side Goiás on loan in May of that year.

On 30 December 2021, after contributing with ten goals in Goiás' promotion to the Série A, Alef Manga joined Coritiba, also promoted to the top tier, on a one-year loan deal. On 10 November of the following year, after being an undisputed starter for the most of the campaign, he signed a permanent two-year contract with the club.

Career statistics

Honours

Club
Maringá
Taça FPF: 2017

Coritiba
Campeonato Paranaense: 2022

Individual
Campeonato Paranaense Divisão de Acesso top goalscorer: 2017 (9 goals)
Taça FPF top goalscorer: 2017 (11 goals)

References

External links
 
 

1994 births
Living people
Sportspeople from Santos, São Paulo
Brazilian footballers
Association football forwards
Campeonato Brasileiro Série A players
Campeonato Brasileiro Série B players
Campeonato Brasileiro Série C players
Campeonato Brasileiro Série D players
Jabaquara Atlético Clube players
Maringá Futebol Clube players
FC Cascavel players
Associação Atlética Coruripe players
Agremiação Sportiva Arapiraquense players
Resende Futebol Clube players
Volta Redonda FC players
Goiás Esporte Clube players
Coritiba Foot Ball Club players
Liga Portugal 2 players
U.D. Oliveirense players
Brazilian expatriate footballers
Brazilian expatriate sportspeople in Portugal
Expatriate footballers in Portugal